Theni is a town and a municipality in Theni district in the Indian state of Tamil Nadu. As of 2011, the town had a population of 94,453. The metro area had the population of 202,100.

Demographics

According to 2011 census, Theni Allinagaram had a population of 94,453 with a sex-ratio of 999 females for every 1,000 males, much above the national average of 929. A total of 9,138 were under the age of six, constituting 4,738 males and 4,400 females. Scheduled Castes and Scheduled Tribes accounted for 16.44% and 0.03% of the population respectively. The average literacy of the town was 77.55%, compared to the national average of 72.99%. The town had a total of  25371 households. There were a total of 37,654 workers, comprising 520 cultivators, 2,798 main agricultural labourers, 694 in house hold industries, 30,450 other workers, 3,192 marginal workers, 56 marginal cultivators, 643 marginal agricultural labourers, 116 marginal workers in household industries and 2,377 other marginal workers. The metro area includes nearby towns and suburban areas such as Palanichettipatti, Puthipuram, Aranmanaiputhur, Mullainagarm, Vadaputhupatti etc. The metro area had the population of 202,100 as of 2011.

As per the religious census of 2011, Theni Allinagaram had 95.04% Hindus, 3.18% Muslims, 1.63% Christians, 0.02% Sikhs, 0.01% Buddhists, 0.12% following other religions and 0.01% following no religion or did not indicate any religious preference.

History
Theni has a historic background during the 19th century. There were many antagonists against British rule like Marutha Nayagam. The famous Saneeswaran (God of Saturn) temple is located in the Kucchanur Village. It is a Suyambhu statue and Pathirakaliyamman Temple, Pathirakalipuram. "Theni In the western gates of Allinagaram village, in the cradle of pansalaru river there is a suyambhu statue created in the name of VEERAPPA  AYYANAR TEMPLE is also there.

Administration
Theni houses the office of the (revenue) District Collector. Periyakulam has the (judicial) district court, which was built and operated in the British period. As the town of Theni is expanding, several local buses are run for commuting inside the town.

Culture
Theni district is rich in flora and fauna. Many dams have been constructed on the rivers, including Vaigai Dam, Sothupparai Dam, Manjalaru Dam, and Meghamalai Dam. Several famous waterfalls are here: Suruli Falls, Kumbakarai Falls and Meghamalai Falls. Theni is surrounded by many tourist attractions like Kodaikannal, Thekkady, Meghamalai, Munnar, Kumbakkarai, Sothuppaarai and Vaigai dam. Because Theni's scenic environment, it is one of the most favoured shooting spots of the Tamil film industry. Thekkady wildlife sanctuary is a nearby attraction which lies in the border between Kerala and Tamil Nadu. There is a temple where Kannaki (historic character) was believed to be turned statue.

The district is famous, because of the celebration of Veerapandy festival at Veerapandy, Veerappa Ayyanar festival at Theni, Kamatchi Amman festival at Devadhanapatti and Saneeswaran Temple at Kuchanoor. Every year in the first or second week of May, people in the Theni district celebrate the Pathirakalipuram Pathirakaliyamman temple festival,Veerapandi Goumari Amman temple Festival. above two festivals goes for eight days and its very grand around Thivakaran

Economy
The cotton ginning, extraction of oil from various oil seeds, cotton and chilly trading are the main business in this district. Many Textile industries are located in and around Theni as the climate is suitable for Textile Industries and it provides employment opportunity for the local people.

Vermiculate used for manufacturing cement and paints are available in Cumbum Valley  area. Once famous  for its agricultural products,  it  retains  its agricultural tint of economy and remains a backward industrial area. Industrial estates have come up with orientation for small  scale and cottage industries.

This clubbed  with  liberalised  financing  by  nationalized banks  and  new enter prenatal  stimuli,  a dimensional change in the  district's  economy  is visible  in the last decade. Hand-loom weaving is the major household  industry in the district. Other important items of making toys and dolls, processing of food articles, manufacturing of safety matches and its allied articles  etc. are  worth  to mention. Coarse blankets are made in Periyakulam taluk.  This  is generally used by tribal women of this area. Wax  printing  is  done at Periyakulam. This was prevalent on  a  large  scale during olden time. This art is slowly declining due to mechanical printing.

Textiles industry is growing on a steady state in Theni. There are many textile industries and they do spinning, weaving, and stitching . The main products are yarns, terry towels, fabrics, polyester. consumer garments, industrial garments and other textile products. These mills making have grown in and around Theni, providing jobs for many people.

Theni's economy is mostly agricultural. Utilisation of land area for cultivation in Theni district is 40.33%. The principal crop production (in tonnes) in 2005-2006 was: sugarcane 1,201,221, cotton 95,360 (561 bales of 170. kg lint each), rice (paddy) 66,093, millets and other cereals 57,081, pulses 6,677, groundnut 4,021 and gingelly 325. Silk, bananas, coconuts, tea, coffee, cardamom, grapes, and mangoes are other main produce of the district.

Surulipatti is a major centre for grape production, with 4,000 small farmers producing over 90,000 tonnes of Muscat grapes, known locally as panneer dhrakshai, and about 10,000 tonnes of Thomson seedless grapes. The unique feature here is that the grapes are harvested throughout the year, while in most grape-growing centres elsewhere the season ends with summer.

Cotton-spinning mills and sugar mills are the major industries in this district. In Andipatti Taluk handloom weaving and power looms are flourishing. In Uthamapalayam Taluk, the Highwavis Estate produces a significant amount of tea. Bodinayakanur is a major market place for cardamom, coffee, tea and black pepper. This city is also called "Cardamom City" because of the large quantity of cardamom trade in this area. It has an auction centre for cardamom.It is also the second biggest town in this district.

The Periyar and Surliar Hydro Power Stations and the Vaigai Micro Hydro Power Station have 181 MW installed capacity and actual power generation of 494 MW in 1996 in this District.

Theni is one of the active business hubs in the western side of Tamil Nadu, inviting more industries to its locality. The district currently has 41.09 km of metre-gauge track serving three railway stations that connect to Madurai.

Theni district has Cumbum town in it, which is famously known behind the name "Cumbum Valley", the only valley in Asia that harvests grapes thrice in a year. Paddy, maize, cotton, sugarcane, grapes, mango, coconut are main agricultural products from Theni. Theni also acts as a distribution hub for Potato, Cabbage, and Cauliflower cultivated in hilly regions to foothill towns in Tamil Nadu. Also it is the hub for distributing Toor dal, Urud dal, Moong dal, Channa dal, Vegetable oils etc. to the hill regions and to Kerala.

Other than agriculture, Theni city has textiles mills, brick industries, iron oxide pigments and masala factories. People do business based on the agricultural commodities.

Education
Horticultural College & Research Institute (HC & RI), one of the constituent colleges of Tamil Nadu Agricultural University, is located at Periyakulam, on the Theni  Dindigul high way in Tamil Nadu State. The college campus is situated at 10oN latitude with an elevation of 300m MSL. The climatic conditions are congenial for the cultivation of an array of horticultural crops. The college campus encompasses over 100 hectares of farm lands to cater the needs of teaching, research, training, seed production and plant propagation activities. This is the only full-fledged Institute providing horticulture education in Southern Peninsular India.

A Fruit Research Station was set up in 1957 at Periyakulam, with a view to meet the needs and aspirations of the fruit crops growing farmers of the erstwhile Madurai district. In the year 1971, Horticultural Research Station (HRS), Periyakulam, was developed which marked the expansion of the research mandate to all major horticultural crops.

The Government Theni Medical College was opened to cater the needs of the people of the district. It has a capacity of 100 students. A large number of patients from neighboring districts of Kerala are treated here. It also has schools run by the government and other organisations.  CPA College is an arts and science college in Bodinayakanur town, which is near Theni.

In 2010 a new government polytechnic college is to be started in Theni, at Kottur village. Madurai Kamarajar University Art and Science College will be started soon in Theni, at Kottur Village.

Theni Kammavar Matriculation Higher Secondary School, NRT Nagar, Palaniyappa memorial higher secondary school,Palanichetti patti, Government Higher Secondary School,G.Kalluppatti, Government Higher Secondary School, Allinagaram, Kalikadevi high school, Pathirakalipuram, Mannar Pandithuraithevar School, Visuvasapuram, The Little Kingdom School,Theni, THNU Matriculation school, THEVARAM, Theni Melapettai Hindu Nadar Uravinmurai Schools, Shemford Theni 10+2 School, Amala Annai Higher Secondary School,T.Sindalacherry, Velammal Matriculation school, Velammal Vidhyalaya,  Renuga Vidhyala Matriculation school, Lakshmipuram, Aringar Anna Primary School.G.Kalluppatti, SUM Primary & Higher Secondary Schools, Royappanpatti, Sri Krishna Ayyar Higher Secondary School, Chinnamanur and Kamma Dharma High School,Govinthanagaram are the prominent schools in the town.

Theni kammavar sangam college of engineering and technology, Jeyaraj Annabakiyam Women's College of  Arts & Science, Nadar Saraswathi Women's College Of Arts & Science, Nadar Saraswathi College Of Engineering, VPV College of Engineering, Devathanapatti, Kalapandian Polytechnic College, Odaiyappa College of Engineering and Technology, Bharath Niketan Polytechnic College, Devangar Polytechnic College, 
, Government Polytechnic College, Kala Pandian Polytechnic College, Thangam Muthu Polytechnic College, Theni Kammavar Sangam Polytechnic College, Theni Government Medical College and Theni College Of Arts and Science are the prominent colleges in Theni.

References

Cities and towns in Theni district